Tommaso Saladini or Saladino (1647–1694) was a Roman Catholic prelate who served as Bishop of Parma (1681–1694).

Biography
Tommaso Saladini was born in Ascoli Piceno, Italy in 1647.
On 23 June 1681, he was appointed during the papacy of Pope Innocent XI as Bishop of Parma.
On 7 July 1681, he was consecrated bishop. 
He served as Bishop of Parma until his death on 21 August 1694.

References

External links and additional sources
 (for Chronology of Bishops) 
 (for Chronology of Bishops) 

17th-century Italian Roman Catholic bishops
Bishops appointed by Pope Innocent XI
1647 births
1694 deaths